Mark Patinkin is an American author and nationally syndicated columnist for the Providence Journal. He is a graduate of Middlebury College.  He was a Pulitzer Prize finalist for international reporting, and he has won three New England Emmy awards for television commentaries. He is also the author of several books. He lives in Providence, Rhode Island.

Mandy Patinkin, the American actor, is his cousin. Don Patinkin (1922–1995), the economist, was his second cousin. Sheldon Patinkin, author, teacher, director, and one of the founding fathers of The Second City, was his second cousin.

Partial bibliography
Up and Running
Rhode Island Dictionary (with Don Bosquet)
Rhode Island Handbook (with Don Bosquet)
The Silent War (with Ira Magaziner)

Living people
Year of birth missing (living people)
American male journalists
American people of Russian-Jewish descent
Jewish American journalists
Middlebury College alumni
University of Chicago Laboratory Schools alumni
Patinkin family
21st-century American Jews